Copa Holdings, S.A. is a publicly traded foreign private issuer listed on the New York Stock Exchange and parent company of Panamanian carrier Copa Airlines and its subsidiary, Colombian carrier Copa Airlines Colombia. It is headquartered in Panama City, Panama and its current CEO is Pedro Heilbron.

Summary 
Copa Holdings, through its operating subsidiaries Copa Airlines and Copa Airlines Colombia, is a leading Latin American commercial aviation provider of passenger and cargo service.  Copa Airlines offers approximately 204 daily scheduled flights to 69 destinations in 29 countries in North, Central and South America and the Caribbean through its Hub of the Americas at Tocumen International Airport in Panama City, Panama.  In addition, Copa Airlines provides passengers with access to flights to more than 120 other international destinations through codeshare agreements with United Airlines and other airlines.  Copa Airlines Colombia, provides domestic service to 12 cities in Colombia as well as international connectivity with Copa Airlines' Hub of the Americas through flights from Bogota, Cali, Medellin, Cartagena, Bucaramanga, Pereira and Barranquilla. Additionally, Copa Airlines Colombia has non-stop international flights from Colombia to Caracas, Quito, Guayaquil and Mexico City.

Board of Directors 

Pedro Heilbron (CEO) 
Stanley Motta (Chairman of the Board)
Alvaro Heilbron
Jaime Arias
Ricardo Alberto Arias
Jose Castañeda Velez
Carlos Motta
Julianne Canavaggio
John Gebo
Andrew Levy
Josh Connor

See also 

 List of airline holding companies#North America

References 

Companies listed on the New York Stock Exchange
Airline holding companies of the United States
Companies based in Panama City